The Northern Provinces of South Africa is a biogeographical area used in the World Geographical Scheme for Recording Plant Distributions (WGSRPD). It is part of the WGSRPD region 27 Southern Africa. The area has the code "TVL". It includes the South African provinces of Gauteng, Mpumalanga, Limpopo (Northern Province) and North West, together making up an area slightly larger than the former Transvaal Province.

See also
 
 Cape Provinces

References

Bibliography

 

 
Biogeography